Peter's threadsnake (Leptotyphlops scutifrons) is a species of snake in the family Leptotyphlopidae. It is widely distributed in  Southern Africa. Following the recognition of its former subspecies, Leptotyphlops pitmani and Leptotyphlops merkeri, as full species, L. scutifrons is no longer thought to occur in East Africa. The limits of its range are still unclear, but it is thought to be present in Angola, Namibia, Botswana, Zimbabwe, South Africa, Eswatini, and western Lesotho.

Gallery

References

External Links
 iNaturalist page

Leptotyphlops
Snakes of Africa
Reptiles of Angola
Reptiles of Botswana
Reptiles of Eswatini
Reptiles of Namibia
Reptiles of South Africa
Reptiles of Zimbabwe
Reptiles described in 1854
Taxa named by Wilhelm Peters